Archie Miller (September 23, 1878 – May 28, 1921) was a United States Army officer who received the Medal of Honor for actions during the Philippine–American War July 2, 1909. Lieutenant Miller defended a machine gun from capture by the enemy. He later rose to lieutenant colonel.

He was serving as a first lieutenant in the 6th U.S. Cavalry at Patian Island, Philippine Islands, on July 2, 1909, when he earned his Medal of Honor. Sergeant Joseph Henderson also received the medal for the same action.

Archie Miller is buried in Arlington National Cemetery Section 1 Lot 200.

Early life
Born in Illinois on September 23, 1878, Col. Miller attended the public schools of Chicago. He was an A.B. man of St. Mary's College, Kansas, and St. Louis University. At the outbreak of the Spanish–American War, he enlisted with the state volunteers and saw service in Cuba, reaching the rank of first lieutenant. In 1899, he went to the Philippines for a year, transferring later to the Regular Army Cavalry.

Miller married Madeleine Whitside, daughter of Brigadier General Samuel Whitside. Their daughter, Caroline, would marry Lieutenant General Robert Whitney Burns.

Military service

Medal of Honor

 Rank and organization: First Lieutenant, 6th U.S. Cavalry.
 Place and date: At Patian Island, Philippine Islands, July 2, 1909.
 Entered service at: St. Louis, Missouri.
 Birth: Fort Sheridan, Illinois.
 Date of issue: 23 Nov 1912.

Citation:
While in action against hostile Moros, when the machinegun detachment, having been driven from its position by a heavy fire, 1 member being killed, did, with the assistance of an enlisted man, place the machinegun in advance of its former position at a distance of about 20 yards from the enemy, in accomplishing which he was obliged to splice a piece of timber to one leg of the gun tripod, all the while being under a heavy fire, and the gun tripod being several times struck by bullets.

A New York Times headline summed up the action in which 1st Lt. Archie Miller and a fellow trooper would be awarded the Medal of Honor, "Battled on Ledge with Moro Outlaws.  Jikiri's Band Wiped Out Only After Desperate Hand-to-Hand Fighting. SOUGHT SAFETY IN CAVE Driven Out by the American Fire, Jikiri Tries to Behead Lieut. Wilson, but Is Shot Down."

Dates of rank

During World War I, Miller was the commanding officer at Kelly and Rich Fields, Texas, and Camp Greene, North Carolina. In July 1918, Lieutenant Colonel Miller was placed in charge of all United States Army Air Service activities on Long Island, New York. As a member of the Air Service, Miller participated in the New York-to-Toronto-and-return air race and the transcontinental race.  In 1919, Col. Miller testified before Congress to the Subcommittee on Aviation of the Committee on Military Affairs, which was considering a bill to create a "united" Air Service separate from either the Army or the Navy.  In his testimony, Miller stated, "I was perhaps one of the original advocates of a united Air Service, immediately after the Armistice."

Death

In addition to Miller, the dead were: Maurice Connolly of Dubuque, Iowa, formerly a member of the House of Representatives; A. G. Batchelder of Washington, chairman of the Board of the American Automobile Association; Lieutenant Stanley M. Ames of Washington, pilot of the wrecked plane; Lieutenant Cleveland M. McDermott, Langley Field, Virginia; Lieutenant John M. Pennewill, Langley Field, Virginia; and Sergeant Mechanic Richard Blumenkranz, Washington.

Army Air Service officers said the accident was the worst in the history of aviation in the United States and that it was one of the few in which all of the passengers in a falling plane had been killed almost instantly.

See also

 List of Medal of Honor recipients
 List of Philippine–American War Medal of Honor recipients
 List of accidents and incidents involving military aircraft (pre-1925)

Notes

External links

 
 
 Archie Miller at ArlingtonCemetery.net, an unofficial website

1878 births
1921 deaths
Accidental deaths in Maryland
Aerial warfare pioneers
American military personnel of the Spanish–American War
Aviators from Illinois
Aviators killed in aviation accidents or incidents in the United States
Burials at Arlington National Cemetery
People from Lake County, Illinois
Philippine–American War recipients of the Medal of Honor
United States Army colonels
United States Army Medal of Honor recipients
Victims of aviation accidents or incidents in 1921
Military personnel from Illinois